DIG Ramesh Prasad Kharel is a policeman from Nepal known for his integrity and fight against corruption within the Nepali Police Force.

Career 
Kharel served as the Deputy Inspector General of Police (DIG) in Pokhara, Kathmandu, and Birgunj. During his stint in Kathmandu, he cracked down on crime in the city, including controlling the gangs and the so-called "dons" of Kathmandu. He also presided over raids on dance clubs that were illegally working as brothels in Kathmandu. He had similarly cracked down on illegal prostitution during his earlier stint in Pokhara.

While in Birgunj in Parsa District, within the first 10 days of his transfer, it was reported that crime was down and the rife corruption within the police force had decreased significantly. The practice of collecting illegal tolls from those importing goods from India was also significantly cut.

In April 2012, he was made Senior Superintendent of Police.

In January 2014, Kharel was recalled to oversee the operations of the Kathmandu Metropolitan Police. Soon after he took office, he made the police officers under him take oath of honesty and hard work. In February he arrested Tejendra Gurung, a notorious gangster. He also started cracking down on massage parlors, dance bars and cabin restaurants suspected of running prostitution and strip shows.

In 2010 he jailed Raj Bahadur Singh, the son-in-law of the ex-King Gyanendra, and in 2011 fired subordinates for corruption. In 2010 Deepak Thapa wrote in Kantipur that Kharel was a "good cop". 

Kharel resigned from the Nepal Police in April 2018.

In 2021 he became the president of the newly formed Nepal Good Governance Party.

In popular culture
A Bhojpuri movie named "SP Kharel" was made being inspired from the work of Ramesh Kharel.

References 

Year of birth missing (living people)
Living people
Nepalese police officers
Khas surnames